Segundona aka Torneio de Apuramento (Qualification Tournament) or Gira Angola is the 2nd division of Angolan football (soccer). It is organized by the Angolan Football Federation and gives access to Angola's top tier football division Girabola.

Unlike most league systems worldwide, Angola does not have a regular second-tier league system. The teams that are relegated from the top-tier league in Angola, the Girabola, are relegated to the provincial championship from which they originate, the so-called provincial stages. The champion of each provincial championship automatically qualifies to the Segundona, the league or tournament that qualifies to the Girabola.

History

The competition's first edition was played in 1981. It was contested by 20 teams divided in four groups of five teams each, with the winner of each group qualifying for the Girabola and the winners of each group contesting for the title of the league champion. Clubs from all provinces of the country disputed the competition. In 2009 the competition was again played by eighteen clubs and officially named as Segundona.

From the 2011 edition on, the winners of the series played a round robin tournament to determine the league champion.

2011–2020
Segundona club participation details 2011–2020

2001–2010
Segundona club participation details 2001–2010

1991–2000
Segundona club participation details 1991–2000

1981–1990
Segundona club participation details 1981–1990

List of champions and series winners

Titles by team

See also
 Girabola
 Taça de Angola
 Supertaça de Angola

References

External links 
Girabola.com – Updated Standings and News

 
 
2
Angola